Joseph Riley (active 1949–1950) is an English former amateur footballer who played as a forward in the Football League for Darlington and in non-league football for Stockton.

Playing at inside left or centre forward, Riley had a run of seven Third Division North matches for Darlington early in the 1949–50 season, beginning with the visit to Doncaster Rovers on 3 September. He scored on his second appearance, in a 4–3 defeat of Bradford City, and again on his sixth, in a 2–1 loss at home to Mansfield Town. His eighth and last senior appearance for Darlington came in December. In October 1949, Riley was selected for an Army XI to play Aston Villa.

References

Year of birth missing (living people)
Living people
Footballers from Stockton-on-Tees
Footballers from County Durham
English footballers
Association football forwards
Stockton F.C. players
Darlington F.C. players
English Football League players
British Army soldiers
20th-century British Army personnel